The Taelayag Spanish Bridge is a historic stone bridge in the United States territory of Guam. It is a stone arch bridge, built sometime between 1866 and 1898, and originally carried the coast road between Agat, Guam and Umatac across Taelayag Stream. This bridge, like most of the bridges that survive from the Spanish period in Guam, was probably taken out of service around 1917.

The bridge was listed on the National Register of Historic Places in 1974.

See also
National Register of Historic Places listings in Guam
List of bridges on the National Register of Historic Places in Guam

References

Road bridges on the National Register of Historic Places in Guam
Bridges in Guam
1800s establishments in the Spanish East Indies
1800s establishments in Oceania
19th-century establishments in Guam
Stone arch bridges in the United States
Agat, Guam